Lines Across Maps are a British math rock band based in Lincolnshire, England. Their music is characterized by a use of complex time signatures and heavy, guitar driven sounds. In December 2011, shortly after the release of their debut EP, Stuart Smith of This Town Needs Guns described the band as "a lot like Colour (now defunct UK math rock band)". The name Lines Across Maps is taken from the This Town Needs Guns song "It's Not True Rufus, Don't Listen To The Hat". Lines Across Maps cite bands such as Jocasta Sleeps, Reuben, Oceansize, Biffy Clyro, Twin Atlantic, Blakfish and Meet Me In St Louis as major influences.

Career
In October 2010, Lines Across Maps released their debut self-titled EP, despite having only been a band for a few months. The CD included three tracks and has, since its release date, been available for free download from the band's Bandcamp site. During the recording process of the EP, they also found time to fulfill their lifelong ambition of writing a Christmas single: "Merry Christmath". This track has enjoyed considerable radio airplay on Xfm, Amazing Radio, BBC Radio 1 in Wales, and was Huw Stephens's ‘Tip of the Week’ just before Christmas 2011  (meaning it was not only aired on BBC Radio 1, but sent to every BBC Introducing show in the country, and played first on Huw Stephens's Christmas podcast).

On 30 January 2012, Lines Across Maps uploaded a teaser video for their second EP to their website, which featured five excerpts from demos and footage of the band practising. The EP, entitled On Second Thoughts, was due for release in 2012.

Releases
Lines Across Maps EP (2010)
"Morning John"
"Butterfly Picture"
"Lentils in Coffee"
Christmath (2010)
"Merry Christmath"

References

Math rock groups
English rock music groups
Musicians from Lincolnshire